Alfonsas Petrulis (1873-1928) was a Lithuanian Roman Catholic priest and journalist, and one of the twenty signatories to the Act of Independence of Lithuania.

Born near Biržai, he attended seminaries at Kaunas, Vilnius and St. Petersburg, and was ordained in 1899. He then served in a number of parishes in the Vilnius Diocese. Petrulis was active in the Lithuanian independence movement from 1899 to 1918; he worked in schools and newspapers, and pressed for the freedom to use the Lithuanian language in the church.

In 1917 he was a member of the Vilnius Conference, and was elected to the Council of Lithuania, signing the Act of Independence in 1918. He then travelled to Switzerland, along with four other council members, to encourage formal recognition of the state. After returning, he served as the Council's secretary and worked on those laws concerning religion in the new republic. He continued serving his pastoral duties until his death in 1928.

References

"Petrulis, Alfonsas". Encyclopedia Lituanica IV: 243. (1970-1978). Ed. Simas Sužiedėlis. Boston, Massachusetts: Juozas Kapočius. LCCN 74-114275.

1873 births
1928 deaths
Lithuanian clergy
People from Biržai District Municipality
People from Biržai
Members of the Council of Lithuania
Lithuanian independence activists